The 2019 Liga 3 Pre-national Route was played from 5 October to 5 December 2019. A total of 15 teams competed in the pre-national route to decide six of the 32 places in the national round of the 2019 Liga 3.

Teams

The following 15 teams entered the pre-national round:

There should be six teams relegated from 2018 Liga 2 that competed in this route, but Persiwa disqualified by PSSI. And also supposedly AS Abadi competed as one of 10 teams that qualified for the second round last season. But they replaced by Tiga Naga. Later, Lampung Sakti and PSIR withdrew from the competition. In October, Solok merged with Equator Luak 50 Kota into SEL 50 Kota and relocated from Solok to Lima Puluh Kota.

Format
In this route, 15 teams divided into three groups. Each group is playing a home-and-away round-robin basis. The winners and runner-ups from each group advanced to national round of 2019 Liga 3.

Details

Group A

Group B

Group C

Qualified teams

The following teams qualified from pre-national route for the national round.

References

External links
 2019 Liga 3 fixtures at PSSI website

2019 Liga 3 (Indonesia)
Liga 3
Liga 3
Liga 3